Syedna Abdullah Badruddin bin Syedna AbdulHusain Husamuddin; born 11 July 1846) was an Indian-born religious leader, and the 50th Da'i al-Mutlaq of the Dawoodi Bohra sect. He was the son of Syedna AbdulHusain Husamuddin, whose family lineage can be traced back to Syedi Fakhruddin Shaheed. When the 49th Da'i al-Mutlaq Syedna Mohammed Burhanuddin did nass upon him, all those people who used to say, "After Syedna Mohammed Burhanuddin, the sect would come to an end", could not believe their eyes.

By virtue of being the son of Syedna AbdulHusain Husamuddin he became very closely associated with his uncle the 47th Da'i al-Mutlaq, Syedna AbdulQadir Najmuddin. He was educated by his father in all fields of knowledge and he always remained at the service of his uncle, for the active part of his childhood and youth until age 39, helping him and also learning from him. Then he served his father for six years when he [his father] became the 48th Da'i al-Mutlaq. Later he also served the 49th Da'i al-Mutlaq Syedna Mohammed Burhanuddin for fifteen years with great dedication and responsibility.

He was awarded with the greatest honor of becoming the 50th Da'i al-Mutlaq of the Dawoodi Bohra sect. In 1915 he conferred nass upon Syedna Taher Saifuddin and died later in the year.

Early life

Syedna Badruddin was the son of Syedna AbdulHusain Husamuddin. He was born in Surat, a city in the state of Gujarat, India. His brothers were Syedi Abdeali Moyyuddin and SheikhAdam Zaiuddin. His childhood was greatly influenced by the Dawoodi Bohra culture, traditions and principles being brought up in a family of Da'i al-Mutlaq. He was educated by his father and while teaching his father soon realised that he was very interested in learning and also was a voracious reader. He had committed to memory the book Da'a'im al-Islam (Pillars of Islam), which contains the rules of how to perform the various tenents of Islam. He had memorized the book in such a manner that he could quote any reference from the book with great accuracy.

Syedna AbdulQadir Najmuddin and his father also taught him and his brother Syedi Abdeali Moiyuddin that knowledge which they had acquired from Syedi Abdeali Imaduddin and both brothers later imparted the same to the 51st Da'i al-Mutlaq Syedna Taher Saifuddin. Thus the knowledge imparted by the 43rd Da'i al-Mutlaq Syedna Abde'Ali Saifuddin traveled a time gap of a hundred years and reached its rightful person, without being disrupted by the learned enemies of the Dawoodi Bohra sect.

During the era of Syedna AbdulQadir Najmuddin,  a 'Hadd-e-Fadil' (a high ranking learned person) of the Dawoodi Bohra sect had predicted the glorious future of Abdullah Badruddin.

Abdul Qadir Najmuddin paid special attention towards all aspects of his upbringing and education along with his brother Syedi Abdeali Moyyuddin. Syedi Abdeali Moyyuddin had also written many prose and poems.

All throughout his youth he utilised most of his time either being with the Da'i al-Mutlaq and helping the Da'i al-Mutlaq in doing religious tasks and at the same time learning from them. Or he was with his father learning the finer points of becoming a Da'i al-Mutlaq. Or he involved himself in doing some activity for the betterment of the members of the community. Or he would lose himself in the books of knowledge.

Life before Da'i al-Mutlaq

Abdullah Badruddin was born in the era of the 47th Da'i al-Mutlaq and his uncle Abdul Qadir Najmuddin. A time when the enemies of the Dawoodi Bohra community hatched a conspiracy stating that nas has not been conferred over Abdul Qadir Najmuddin by the 46th Da'i al-Mutlaq Mohammed Badruddin. This created a lot of chaos and confusion among members of the community. To this allegation his uncle never said anything but just stated that the fifth Da'i al-Mutlaq from him will answer his enemies. His uncle travelled extensively amongst the colonies of the members of the Dawoodi Bohra community to teach them, to educate them and also gave the permission to all learned members of the Dawoodi Bohra community to teach the common members as to what the truth is. He supported his uncle, so did other learned members of the community. Together they were able to bring back many members who had gone astray due to claims by enemies and also increased the faith of those members who stood by his uncle. But all these activities caused a great drain on the funds of the Dawoodi Bohra sect and causing the sect to become more indebted.

When his father became the 48th Da'i al-Mutlaq he also inherited all the debts that was over the Dawoodi Bohra community. Those were very enduring times for the Dawoodi Bohra sect. At that time he stood firmly by his father and did everything his father asked him to do so as to reduce the debts.

Then Mohammed Burhanuddin, his cousin brother became the 49th Da'i al-Mutlaq. His cousin brother charted out a plan to get the debt ridden Dawoodi Bohra sect out of its dues and free from the shackles of the lenders. For that his cousin brother made a fund called 'Dawoodi Fund' with an intention to collect money for paying off the debts. Again he took up this task and totally engrossed himself in collecting funds. So much so that he would leave early in the morning, hire a carriage and visit shops to collect funds, even at the time of lunch he would continue the work at hand and after coming home he would eat alone. Seeing his dedication one of his uncles commented saying that, 'the one whom he is serving day and night doesn't even wait for him (to have food together)', referring to his cousin brother.

But when his cousin brother conferred nas upon him and he became the 50th Da'i al-Mutlaq of the Dawoodi Bohra sect, the same uncle admitted that the one who serves gets served in return.

Thus he had the great honor of serving three Da'i al-Mutlaq and also received the grace of becoming the 50th Da'i al-Mutlaq.

Life as Da'i al-Mutlaq

Abdullah Badruddin's face had the radiance of a full moon. Every person seeing him was awestruck by his grace.

He became the 50th Da'i al-Mutlaq by virtue of the nas done by the 49th Da'i al-Mutlaq Mohammed Burhanuddin in Surat in the year 1906.

Due to all the efforts of three Da'i al-Mutlaq Abdul Qadir Najmuddin, Abdul Husain Husamuddin and especially due to the planned efforts of 49th Da'i al-Mutlaq Mohammed Burhanuddin, when the helm of Dawoodi Bohra sect came into his hands there was prosperity and development all around in the Dawoodi Bohra community. He had also made a tremendous and remarkable contribution in achieving this position during the period of all the three Da'i al-Mutlaq.
 
In 1907 he performed his first waaz (sermon) on the day of Ashura (the tenth day of the first month, Moharam ul Haram, as per the Hijri calendar). Seeing him perform the waaz the belief of the learned members of the community was reaffirmed, that the grace and blessings of the Imam in seclusion is with him.

In his extensive travelling he also laid the foundations of many masjids (places for performing prayers). Some of these masjids were completed while he was the Da'i al-Mutlaq and were inaugurated by him. The rest were completed during the times of the 51st Da'i al-Mutlaq Taher Saifuddin. He also reconstructed the Daras us Saifee (now known as Al Jamea tus Saifiyah, Surat) adding a few new structures.

During his travels he always insisted that the members of the Dawoodi Bohra community devote their time for reading and learning the religious books of the Dawoodi Bohra sect. He was also well known for strictly practicing the tenents of Islam. He also administered the practice of making the members of the Dawoodi Bohra community follow the tenents.

He conferred nas upon his nephew Taher Saifuddin in 1915, in Dumas, Surat. When his nephew came to seek his blessing the next day he was informed about the nas. His nephew's eyes were filled with tears. At that time he called his nephew closer and keeping a hand over his nephew's shoulders he said, "Brother, I know that the dark clouds of a conspiracy is already looming above and you are all alone. But don't keep any kind of doubt in your mind. You have the complete support of the Imam in seclusion. And I hope that the Imam in seclusion reveals himself on brother's hands."

He died on 25 January 1915 (10 Rabiul Awwal 1333H).

Achievements

In the times of his uncle the 47th Da'i al-Mutlaq Abdul Qadir Najmuddin when the enemies spread rumors that the 46th Da'i al-Mutlaq Mohammed Badruddin has not conferred nas upon his uncle, who had remained silent but later said that the fifth Da'i al-Mutlaq from him will answer his enemies. His uncle with the help of him and other learned members of the community began to travel extensively and impart teaching to the members of the community and explain to them the truth regarding the nas. Abdullah Badruddin with his knowledge and persuasive tact brought back many members of the Dawoodi Bohra sect who had been deceived by the enemies claims. By his irrefutable arguments he also strengthed the belief of the people who stood by his uncle.

When his father Abdul Husain Husamuddin became the 48th Da'i al-Mutlaq there were huge debts over Dawoodi Bohra sect. Those were the most difficult times for him who stood by his father with the determination and dedication, following each and every instruction of his father and doing everything in his power to get the Dawoodi Bohra sect out of debt.

Later he showed the same zeal and reverence in his service towards his cousin brother the 49th Da'i al-Mutlaq Mohammed Burhanuddin. Such that when his cousin brother announced the formation of Dawoodi Fund to pay off the debts of the Dawoodi Bohra sect, he again took it upon himself to collect the funds . He would put in all his efforts day and night, using all his skills of persuasion and knowledge to make people understand the difficulties of living with such a debt such that they become ready to participate in the effort to repay the debt. Such was the effort put in by him that all the debts of the Dawoodi Bohra sect was paid off within or at the end of five years.

He also helped his cousin brother in setting up an efficient and effective organisational structure to ensure the smooth functioning of the various offices of the community. First studying the functioning of various departments then tuning them to work with each other and then ironing out the issues. Then the authorities and responsibilities of the office holders were charted out and each office holder was made aware of the same. And within a period of five years all the departments were functioning like a single unit allowing the Dawoodi Bohra sect to take off on its developmental flight.

Then his cousin brother set up a plan to develop and uplift the members of the Dawoodi Bohra, he again took it upon himself and engrossed himself into it. He and his cousin brother have pulled members of the Dawoodi Bohra sect out of poverty and low income generating businesses and jobs and guided them into substantial income earning techniques so that soon their fortunes changed and so did the prospects of the Dawoodi Bohra sect. Within a period of five years the once debt ridden sect was now flourishing and growing at a great pace.

It was at this time that he became the 50th Da'i al-Mutlaq. He continued with the development process in his era too.

He completed the works of various masjids and other structures that were started by his cousin brother and he too laid the foundations for many masjids in his time. He also reconstructed the Daras us Saifiyah (now known as Al Jamea tus Saifiyah).

References

Dawoodi Bohras
1846 births
1915 deaths
20th-century Ismailis